Vigorous may refer to:
 Operation Vigorous, a Second World War Allied operation involving escorting a supply convoy to Malta
 , a British Second World War submarine
 USCGC Vigorous (WMEC-627), a United States Coast Guard cutter